Undead is a live album by Ten Years After, recorded at the small jazz club, Klooks Kleek, in London, May 1968, and released in July of that year. The show combined blues, boogie and jazz playing that merged more traditional rock and roll with 1950s-style jump blues. The album "amply illustrates" Alvin Lee's "eclectic" use of the pentatonic scale mixed with other modalities.

Track listing

Side one
"I May Be Wrong, But I Won't Be Wrong Always" (Alvin Lee) - 10.28
"Woodchopper's Ball" (Woody Herman, Joe Bishop) - 7:48

Side two
"Spider in My Web" (Alvin Lee) - 7:46
"Summertime" (George Gershwin) / "Shantung Cabbage" (Ric Lee) - 5:56
"I'm Going Home" (Alvin Lee) - 6:27

2002 CD reissue
"Rock Your Mama" (Alvin Lee) - 3:46
"Spoonful" (Willie Dixon) - 6:23
"I May Be Wrong, But I Won't Be Wrong Always" - 9:49
"Summertime" / "Shantung Cabbage" - 5:44
"Spider in Your Web" - 7:43
"Woodchopper's Ball" - 7:38
"Standing at the Crossroads" (Elmore James & Robert Johnson) - 4:10
"I Can't Keep from Crying, Sometimes / Extension on One Chord / I Can't Keep from Crying, Sometimes (reprise)" (Al Kooper, Chick Churchill, Leo Lyons, Alvin Lee, Ric Lee) - 17:04
"I'm Going Home" - 6:24

Personnel
Ten Years After
Alvin Lee - guitar, vocals
Chick Churchill - organ
Ric Lee - drums
Leo Lyons - bass

Charts

Album
Album - Billboard (United States)

Release history

References

Ten Years After albums
1968 live albums
Decca Records live albums
Albums produced by Mike Vernon (record producer)